The quattrino is an ancient Italian currency denomination largely used in Central Italy, especially in Tuscany and Rome. Its name derives from the Latin quater denari, because its value was equal to four denari. Consequently, its value was one third of a soldo. It disappeared after the unification of Italy in 1861, when the Italian lira was introduced as an equivalent of the french franc.

See also
 Lira
 Soldo
 Denier

Currencies of Italy
Coins of Italy